Elizabethtown, California was a California Gold Rush town that began in 1852 in Plumas County, California. It was named after a woman in the miners camp called Elizabeth Stark Blakesley.

It is said that the value of gold taken from the Elizabethtown area ran into the millions of dollars. It was started from other gold mining camps all around American Valley (where Quincy, CA is now located). In 1852, a 10 to 15 family wagon train came up Beckwourth Pass (which was created by James Beckwourth, the first pioneer to this area). They brought a large supply of horses, oxen, cows, and other needed supplies and were the first settlers of American Valley. When they got there, they found a population of hundreds of Maidu Indians, who were peaceful and friendly.

In 1852 Alexander and Frank Tate discovered gold in what is known as Tate ravine. After that, Lewis Stark, Peter Day, and George Ferrier one morning went up Elizabeth ravine and by noon they panned out an ounce of gold. After dinner they found several ounces using a rocker. After digging a small ditch, they discovered one 28 ounce gold piece. After that many miners came to search for gold which developed into a village. Later on Elizabethtown was also known as Betysburg after a rivalry started with Quincy. The winter of 1852 and 1853 were very harsh with low provisions. So the spring of 1853 the Stark family went to Sacramento Valley and hauled up many cattle for beef for the starving families.

In 1854 a Masonic Lodge was built there. Also in 1854 Elizabethtown got postal service with Lewis Stark as Postmaster. W.A. Blakesley was the Deputy and used his house as the office. In January 1855 the postal service was moved to Quincy.
The rich mining claims of 1853 and 1854 were: The Wahoo, by Joseph Kelley & Co.; Fowler, by Fowler & Co.; Varner, by Varner & Co.; Plumas, by L.F. Cate & Co.; O'Neill, by Captain 
O'Neill; Gloyd, by D.J. Gloyd; and Betsy Guilch, by Stark & Co.

The Population of Elizabethtown got up around 2000 and 2500 people between 1853 and 1856. The first year over 30 county licenses were issued for business in the area. The Main Street extended across the entire town. There were many stores, two-story buildings, saloons, gambling houses, shops, gilded palaces, lodging houses, and eating houses. They also had a lodge for the Sons Of Temperance (see Temperance movement) which had over 200 members.
 
In 1857 and 1858 there was some demoralization within the town with the Comstock mines in Virginia City, Nevada (see Comstock Lode). Many residents ended up living in Indian and Honey Lake valleys. Many buildings were moved to Quincy and rebuilt there and slowly the town dissolved into history.

After the "New Year's Flood" in January, 1997, a local resident discovered the cobblestone corner of a foundation had been exposed by the high water flow through the creek bed. The former excavations of the brick foundation has been covered over and no longer are visible.

There is a stone and metal monument to the town by the Native Sons and Daughters of Quincy on September 9, 1927.

References

External links
Plumas County Museum

Former settlements in Plumas County, California
Mining communities of the California Gold Rush
California Historical Landmarks
History of the Sierra Nevada (United States)
Quincy, California
Populated places established in 1852
1852 establishments in California
Former populated places in California